, <onlyinclude> also known simply as Madoka Magica, is a 2011 Japanese anime television series created by Magica Quartet, and animated by Shaft. The story follows a group of middle school girls, led by protagonist Madoka Kaname, who make supernatural contracts to become magical girls. In battling surreal enemies known as "witches", they learn of the anguish and peril associated with their new roles.

The first ten episodes of the series aired in Japan on TBS and MBS between January and March 2011, while the final two episodes were delayed until April 2011 due to the 2011 Tōhoku earthquake and tsunami. A manga adaptation of the anime and various spin-off manga have been published by Houbunsha and licensed in North America by Yen Press. A novelization by Nitroplus was released in August 2011, and a dedicated magazine, Manga Time Kirara Magica, was launched by Houbunsha in June 2012. A video game for the PlayStation Portable was released in March 2012 and another for PlayStation Vita was released in December 2013. A smartphone game, Magia Record, launched in August 2017, and a three-season anime adaptation produced by Shaft aired from January 2020 to April 2022.

An anime film series, beginning with two films recapping the television series, was released in October 2012. A third film featuring an original story, Rebellion, was released in October 2013. In April 2021, it was announced that a sequel to Rebellion was in production.

Puella Magi Madoka Magica has received widespread critical acclaim, with praise for its complex narrative, visuals, themes, and soundtrack as well as its unconventional approach to the magical girl subgenre. It became a commercial success; each Blu-ray Disc volume sold more than 50,000 copies in Japan. The series garnered a variety of awards, such as the Television Award at the 16th Animation Kobe Award, as well as 12 Newtype Anime Awards and the Grand Prize for the Animation Division at the 15th Japan Media Arts Festival in 2011.

Plot

In the fictional city of Mitakihara, Japan, a middle school student named Madoka Kaname and her best friend, Sayaka Miki, encounter a small, cat-like creature named Kyubey. It offers a contract in which a girl may have any wish granted in exchange for obtaining magical powers and being tasked with fighting witches. Meanwhile, a transfer student and mysterious magical girl named Homura Akemi tries to stop Madoka from making the contract with Kyubey. Madoka and Sayaka then meet Mami Tomoe, an upperclassman at the same school who is also a magical girl. Noticing their indecisiveness on whether to become a magical girl, Mami offers to take Madoka and Sayaka along on her witch hunts so they may learn of the responsibilities that come with being a magical girl.

However, after witnessing Mami's death at the hands of a witch, Madoka realizes the life of a magical girl is filled with suffering and pain. This is further enforced by the appearance of Kyoko Sakura, a veteran magical girl whose wish unintentionally caused the death of her family. Madoka also discovers magical girls give up their souls to form Soul Gems, the source of their magic, and that when Soul Gems become too tainted with despair, magical girls are converted into witches. Sayaka decides to become a magical girl after learning that doing so would allow her to heal a young musician whom she admires. However, her classmate Hitomi Shizuki confesses her love to him first, causing Sayaka to become disillusioned and fall into an inescapable despair that turns her into a witch. Kyubey reveals to Madoka that he is of an alien race that has been harvesting the emotions of magical girls for centuries to use as energy to counteract the spread of entropy, and thus stave off the heat death of the universe. Madoka also learns that Homura is a magical girl from a different timeline who has repeated the same month countless times to try to save Madoka from a grisly fate. 

Madoka and Kyoko attempt to reverse Sayaka's transformation, but the plan fails and Kyoko is forced to sacrifice herself to allow Madoka to escape, leaving Homura as the only remaining magical girl. Following this, an extremely powerful witch known as Walpurgisnacht approaches the city. Homura attempts to stop it, but is defeated. She begins to lose hope and is on the verge of becoming a witch when Madoka arrives. With the past month's events in mind, Madoka decides to become a magical girl and makes a wish to stop the creation of all witches in the past, present, and future. The paradoxical nature of her wish causes her to transcend into a godlike psychopomp, and establishes a new "Law of Cycles" in which magical girls are purified and disappear into a higher plane instead of becoming witches. A new reality, in which Homura is the only one who remembers Madoka, is formed. Homura vows to continue fighting in honor of Madoka and the world she cherished.

Production

Development
While collaborating on Hidamari Sketch and Bakemonogatari, Akiyuki Shinbo told Aniplex producer Atsuhiro Iwakami he wanted to create a new magical girl series, beginning the development of Puella Magi Madoka Magica. During the early planning stage, Iwakami decided not to adapt an existing work to give Shinbo more freedom in his direction style. Another goal of the project was to develop an anime that would appeal to a wider audience than the usual demographic for media within the magical girl subgenre. Iwakami and Shinbo intended their series to be accessible to "the general anime fan". Shinbo then asked Gen Urobuchi to work on the project as a scriptwriter and Ume Aoki as original character designer. Takahiro Kishida was engaged to adapt Aoki's character designs for the television series.

In his role as producer, Iwakami took a mostly hands-off approach. Because Puella Magi Madoka Magica is an original series rather than an adaptation of an existing work, his main goal was "coming up with a high-quality piece of entertainment". After helping to recruit the staff, he allowed them freedom to develop the content of the story, providing minimal guidance. After viewing the character designs that Aoki created, he was sure he could trust the creative talent of the team. In an interview with Anime News Network after the series finished airing in Japan, Iwakami said, "I don't matter much; it's up to those talents to do their work. If something comes to a stand-still I might intervene, but they did an excellent job and I was very happy seeing the results in episode one."

Writing
During the pre-writing planning phase, Iwakami asked Urobuchi to make the storyline "heavy". Shinbo specified it should contain copious amounts of blood and violence, elements that were unusual in the magical girl genre. Iwakami also asked for many of the magical girl characters to be killed throughout the series. Urobuchi said he had no trouble with these requirements, referencing his past reputation as a writer of very dark and somber stories, the extent of which Shinbo had not known.

One objective was for the script to contrast starkly with the way the anime was to be marketed. Shinbo planned to advertise the series innocently and purely that would deliberately conceal its dark undertones. For example, the title logo was rendered using rounded fonts that would appear harmless to audiences. Urobuchi further misled fans by using his Twitter account to persuade them the plot of the series was innocuous. The true nature of the series was disguised because Shinbo wanted its dark themes to be a complete surprise to the viewers. Iwakami later defended the mature themes in the Puella Magi Madoka Magica, stating, "the story of Madoka is serious but it's not entirely inappropriate for children. For example, there's nothing sexually explicit in it. There's some death, but it's not gratuitous; it can be explained within the context of the story."

Shinbo granted Urobuchi a large amount of autonomy in writing the series and determining the path of the story. In describing his interactions with Iwakami and Shinbo while working on the series, Urobuchi commented that "neither one is the type to show their hand, they would always wait for me to make the next move". To create a successful deconstruction of the magical girl genre, Urobuchi studied aspects of traditional magical girl media that were "troubling or overlooked". He also stated the plot development was heavily influenced by the character drawings by Aoki, and credited  horror fiction author Stephen King and Shinbo's previous projects such as Hidamari Sketch and Magical Girl Lyrical Nanoha as inspirations for the series.

Urobuchi attributed his experience working on projects with screenwriters Ichiro Itano and Yōsuke Kuroda as a major influence in his writing for Puella Magi Madoka Magica, and has referred to both of them as his mentors. To set the initial pacing of the series, Urobuchi used a technique he credited to Kuroda. The first episode would throw the viewer into a specific part of the story with unknown context. The second episode would define the rules governing the story's setting. The third episode would divulge the revelation in the plot to hook the viewer. The twist in the third episode was determined during the project proposal stage and involves the death of Mami, the main character. This decision was controversial; Urobuchi said production staff continually approached him and asked him to reconsider because of their fondness for the character. He refused and the plot remained unchanged during production. Urobuchi realized this progression could be very hard for viewers to accept and might hurt the overall series' success with some audiences; he said, "I always thought this is an age where entertainment basically is about soothing and healing, like adopting a style where unchanging day-to-day life is to continue forever".

In an interview with Ultra Jump Egg, Urobuchi gave insight into his writing philosophy, stating that he believed the overarching plot of a story was more important than its characters. He said he would first determine the actions and the ultimate fate of a character before even assigning it a name, and contrasted this with other writing methods that first focused on developing the characters and then creating a storyline for them to follow. He again defended his decision to have Mami die, saying this could have the effect of making the character more memorable, saying, "I think there are quite many characters who became immortal exactly because they died, like Caesar Zeppeli in JoJo's Bizarre Adventure or Raoh in Fist of the North Star. Precisely because of the way they died, they were able to live forever."

Character design
Urobuchi stated that Sayaka was his favorite character overall and said her plotline was the most enjoyable to write. Because of her grim fate by the end of the series, a destiny that Shinbo believed was slightly unfair, he asked Urobuchi if it was possible to change the plot so Sayaka could be spared. Urobuchi declined, saying her death was integral to the overarching story. Shinbo then asked if she could be brought back to life, saying he had become very attached to the character. Urobuchi again refused, saying this would be impossible because of the already-established rules governing the story. Shinbo acquiesced to this but said he believed there may have been too large a burden placed on the characters who were young, middle-school girls.

The alien character Kyubey was also envisioned and designed by Urobuchi. Iwakami stated that as one of the primary antagonists in the series, "the mash-up of cuteness and darkness is the central theme to Madoka, and Kyubey is an epitome of that theme". A central goal in Urobuchi's writing was to highlight the moral and ethical dissonance between Kyubey and the young middle school girls, which was done through actions such as Kyubey eating its own corpse to recycle energy. He compared the character to monsters in the works of horror fiction author H. P. Lovecraft, commenting of Kyubey: "he isn't evil, it is his lack of feelings that make him scary". Urobuchi also remarked upon the moral ambiguity the series displays in an interview with Asahi Shimbun, stating "Al-Qaeda brought down the Twin Towers due to their self-righteousness. Justice for some people is an evil for others. Good intentions, kindness, and hope will not necessarily make people happy."

Due to unforeseen scheduling problems with Shaft, production of the series was postponed for three years following the completion of its writing. Once the issues were resolved, production began without further complications. The animation studio led the conception and design of the witches, and created each one's individual backstory. Urobuchi had originally envisioned the witches to be similar to conventional monsters such as Godzilla, but upon seeing the surreal concept art for one of the main witches, Walpurgis Night, he said; "How can Homura possibly fight against something like this?" Designers from Shaft added quotations from the German folklorist Faust to the series. Throughout production, the animation production team Gekidan Inu Curry had freedom to insert new details and to modify existing ones from the original script; for example, during a scene in the final episode in which the team added black wings to Homura—something that was not included in Urobuchi's writing. Urobuchi praised this aspect of the production, commenting, "additions by the animation production team added more mystery and depth to [the] characters, and without them, it would have been very difficult to write any further stories in the world of the series".

Music
Iwakami and Shinbo recruited Yuki Kajiura to compose the soundtrack for the series after Urobuchi recommended her. Shinbo had previously worked with Kajiura on Le Portrait de Petit Cossette; Urobuchi told of the inspirational effect the music from that series had on him while writing parts of the script. Urobuchi said he had long been a fan of Kajiura's anime soundtracks and  praised her work ethic, saying she would always familiarize herself with the story's plotline while composing for it. Japanese pop music duo ClariS was also commissioned to perform the series' opening theme . Iwakami involved himself in the song's development to ensure it would fit with the series, marking one of the few times he intervened in an aspect of the production. Both "Connect" and the ending theme "Magia" by Kalafina were revealed in a television commercial several weeks before the series' premiere in Japan.

Broadcast and distribution

On January 7, 2011, Puella Magi Madoka Magica debuted on Mainichi Broadcasting System (MBS), Tokyo Broadcasting System (TBS), and Chubu-Nippon Broadcasting (CBC) in Japan. The first ten episodes aired weekly without interruption and were made available for streaming on Nico Nico Douga and BIGLOBE's Anime One service.  That March, the planned broadcasts of the last two episodes were halted because of the 2011 Tōhoku earthquake and tsunami; TBS also canceled its scheduled airing of the 10th episode so it could provide more news coverage of the natural disaster.

Urobuchi apologized to viewers for the delays; he also said the postponements could be viewed in a positive light because they alleviated some production pressures on animation studio Shaft because of the tight broadcast schedule. Citing particularly challenging drawings for episodes 11 and 12, Urobuchi and Iwakami planned to have Shaft continue to improve the episodes up until their rescheduled broadcasts. According to Urobuchi if episode 11 had been aired in its current state as scheduled, the result would likely have been disappointing. On March 23, 2011, the broadcast for the rest of the series was indefinitely delayed but the production team reported that they were continuing to work on the episodes and announced their intention to finish airing the series by April.<ref name="ANNDelayedIndefinitely">{{Cite web |last=Loo |first=Egan |date=March 23, 2011 |title=Madoka Magicas Airing, Streaming Delayed 'For Now' (Updated) |url=http://www.animenewsnetwork.com/news/2011-03-23/madoka-magica-airing-streaming-delayed-for-now |url-status=live |archive-url=https://web.archive.org/web/20210125043042/https://www.animenewsnetwork.com/news/2011-03-23/madoka-magica-airing-streaming-delayed-for-now |archive-date=January 25, 2021 |access-date=May 19, 2011 |website=Anime News Network |publisher=}}</ref> On April 10, 2011, the official website for Puella Magi Madoka Magica announced that broadcasts would resume on April 21. Episodes 11 and 12 aired back-to-back on MBS while TBS and CBC ran episode 10 together with episodes 11 and 12.

Iwakami later commented on this unique production experience in an interview with Anime News Network. He said Shaft was always pressed for time during the production process and only just completed each episode before its air time. After the earthquake and tsunami, he stated that many of the company's staff were upset by the incident and were unable to work effectively on episodes 11 and 12. He said, however, "a week went by, and two weeks went by, and the staff started saying that they couldn't stay in shock forever, that they had to keep on going, and then production continued". The series was released on six Blu-ray Disc (BD) and DVD volumes between April 27 and September 21, 2011, having been delayed by the earthquake from the original release date of March 30, 2011. Drama CDs were included with the first, third, and fifth BD/DVD volumes. The sixth and final volume released on September 21, 2011, contains a director's edit of episode 12. The series began streaming on Crunchyroll on February 15, 2012, as well as on Hulu and Crackle. 

Aniplex of America released the series in North America, including an English dub, in three BD and DVD volumes released between February 14 and June 12, 2012. Aniplex also released limited editions containing the original soundtrack CDs and special items. Manga Entertainment licensed the series in the United Kingdom and released it on October 29, 2012 on BD and DVD in a complete collection. Madman Entertainment licensed the series in Australia, where it was broadcast on the children's channel ABC Me on June 29, 2013, following an early preview on January 6. The dubbed series began streaming on Viz Media's streaming service Neon Alley in late 2013. In Italy, the anime was broadcast on Rai 4 on February 5 until April 22, 2012. On September 1, 2018, a television anime series based on the smartphone game Magia Record was announced. It was originally scheduled to begin airing in 2019, but it was delayed to a January 2020 premiere. It began airing on January 4, 2020.

Related media
Films

In November 2011, it was announced in the December issue of Kadokawa Shoten's Newtype magazine that Shaft was developing a three-part theatrical film project. The first film, which covers the first eight episodes of the television series, was released in theaters on October 6, 2012, while the second film, which covers the last four episodes, was released on October 13, 2012. The first two films were screened in selected locations in the United States and seven other countries between October 2012 and February 2013; they were also screened at Anime Festival Asia between November 10 and 11, 2012, in Singapore. The two films were released on Blu-ray Disc and DVD on July 30, 2013, in standard and collector's edition sets and is being made available for import by Aniplex of America. The third film, titled , features a new story written by Urobuchi and acts as a sequel to the television series. It was released to Japanese theaters on October 26, 2013. The film received a North American imported release on December 3, 2013. The first and second films were re-released with an English dub on July 15, 2014.

A short concept film for a new story, described as a "movie-based image board", was debuted at Shaft's anniversary exhibition Madogatari on November 27, 2015. Shaft representative director and president Mitsutoshi Kubota later confirmed in an interview in Newtype that the concept film will launch a new Puella Magi Madoka Magica project.

At a 10th anniversary event held on April 25, 2021, a sequel movie to Rebellion was announced, titled .

Print media

Houbunsha has published several manga series based on Puella Magi Madoka Magica. A direct adaptation of the anime series was illustrated by Hanokage and published in three four-chapter tankōbon volumes that were released between February 12 and May 30, 2011. The manga has been licensed in North America by Yen Press. A side story manga titled , which was written by Masaki Hiramatsu and illustrated by Takashi Tensugi, was serialized in Manga Time Kirara Forward between March 2011 and January 2013. A third manga titled , which was written by Kuroe Mura, was released in two tankōbon volumes on May 12, 2011, and June 12, 2011. Both Kazumi Magica and Oriko Magica have been licensed by Yen Press in North America. The first volume of Kazumi Magica was released in May 2013. , which was written and illustrated by Hanokage, began serialization in the 20th issue of Manga Time Kirara Magica released on June 10, 2015. The plot describes the events that happened between Puella Magi Madoka Magica the Movie: Eternal and Puella Magi Madoka Magica the Movie: Rebellion. Yen Press will publish it in English.

The first volume of an official anthology comic featuring illustrations by guest artists was released on September 12, 2011. A dedicated monthly magazine published by Houbunsha and titled  was launched on June 8, 2012; it features various manga stories, including spin-off stories of Oriko Magica. A film comic adaptation of the series titled Puella Magi Madoka Magica: Film Memories went on sale on May 26, 2012. Puella Magi Madoka Magica: The Different Story, another manga by Hanokage, was published in three tankōbon volumes between October 12 and November 12, 2012, and was licensed by Yen Press in 2014. , which was written and illustrated by Afro, is serialized in Manga Time Kirara Magica; its first volume was released in October 2013 and was licensed by Yen Press. , written by Kawazukuu and illustrated by Masugitsune, was serialized in Manga Time Kirara Magica and released two volumes in December 2013; Yen Press licensed the manga.

Hajime Ninomae wrote a novel adaptation of the series that was illustrated by Yūpon and published by Nitroplus on August 14, 2011. Pre-release copies were available at Comiket 80 on August 12, 2011. A book titled Puella Magi Madoka Magica: The Beginning Story, which is based on Gen Urobuchi's original draft treatment for the anime,  was released in November 2011.

Video games
A video game based on the series titled  and designed for the PlayStation Portable was released by Namco Bandai Games on March 15, 2012. The game allows players to take many routes and change the ending of the story. Urobuchi returned as the writer and Shaft animated the title, while Yusuke Tomizawa and Yoshinao Doi produced it. The game was released in two editions; a standard box including a bonus DVD, and a limited edition box containing a Madoka Figma, a bonus Blu-ray Disc, a Kyubey pouch, a 'HomuHomu' handkerchief and a special clear card. An action game for the PlayStation Vita titled  was developed by Artdink and published by Namco Bandai Games, and was released in Japan on December 19, 2013. The game features an original story that was created with guidance from Urobuchi in which all five magical girls team up to defeat a powerful witch called Walpurgis Night. Upon release, a limited edition version that included codes for additional in-game costumes and merchandise such as a CD copy of the game's soundtrack and an art book, was also on sale.

A free smartphone application called  was released on October 14, 2011. A third-person shooter (TPS) titled Puella Magi Madoka Magica TPS featuring Homura Akemi was released for Android devices in December 2011. A second TPS title featuring Mami was released in August 2012 and a third featuring Sayaka and Kyoko was released on October 16, 2012. A puzzle game for iOS devices titled Puella Magi Madoka Magica Puzzle of Memories was released on March 29, 2013. Costumes from Puella Magi Madoka Magica, alongside content based on other anime and games, are available in Japan as downloadable content (DLC) for the PSP game Gods Eater Burst. Costumes and accessories are also available as DLC for Tales of Xillia 2, and were available for Phantasy Star Online 2 in October 2013. Another collaboration with the mobile game Phantom of the Kill took place for an event that ran from August 8, 2015 to September 21, 2015. During that campaign, players had a chance of obtaining playable Madoka characters through in-game lotteries. Puella Magi Madoka Magica-themed missions, weapons and items were also available at that time.

A pachinko game titled Slot Puella Magi Madoka Magica was released in 2013, and a second pachinko game titled Slot Puella Magi Madoka Magica 2 was released in 2016. Slot Puella Magi Madoka Magica 2 features the song "Naturally" by Aoi Yūki and Eri Kitamura. Also in 2016, the smartphone game Girl Friend Beta announced a collaboration with Puella Magi Madoka Magica in which players got a Madoka card as a log-in bonus. A smartphone game called Magia Record: Puella Magi Madoka Magica Side Story, was released in Japan on August 22, 2017. The game features a new protagonist named Iroha Tamaki, who arrives in Kamihama City to search for her missing sister. The game features the theme song  by TrySail. An anime adaptation of the game premiered on January 4, 2020.

Reception
Critical reception
Puella Magi Madoka Magica has received widespread critical acclaim. Masaki Tsuji lauded the series' world-building and narrative as well as the character development, and called the series groundbreaking. Masaki went on to say that Madoka Magica has reached a "level of perfection", and noted that the series is worthy of people's admiration. UK Anime Network'''s Andy Hanley rated the anime 10 out of 10 and lauded it for its deeply emotional content, and described it as immersive and filled with grandiose visuals along with an evocative soundtrack. He recommended watching it several times to fully comprehend the complex and multi-layered plot. Hanley called it the greatest television anime series of the 21st century thus far. Scott Green of Ain't It Cool News called the series "hugely admirable"; he praised the animation team's attention to detail, stating that the series "would not work nearly as well if the characters in general and as magical girls specifically weren't presented so spectacularly winningly by the production". Green also said he would highly recommend Puella Magi Madoka Magica to anyone with an interest in anime.

Michael Pementel of Bloody Disgusting called Madoka Magica a "fascinating work", and lauded its dark atmosphere and horror elements. Pementel highly praised the show's aesthetics and wrote that the "pacing in revealing twists" is one of the "show's most exceptional qualities" and also commended the characters tragic arc—particularly Sayaka and Homura. He further praised the series for offering "unique, grim twist that not only seeps the show in despair, but subverts the subgenre", concluding that Madoka Magica "stands as one of the best works of anime horror, presenting characters that must strive to find hope through profound darkness." THEM Anime Reviews reviewer Tim Jones called it "beautiful, well-written, and surprisingly dark", and gave it four out of five stars. Jones also commended the unique animation and design of the backdrops shown during witch fights, which he described as "surreal, beautiful, [and] trippy". In his review of the three blu-ray volumes of the anime series, Zac Bertschy of Anime News Network characterized the story as very emotionally dark and one of the most ambitious and beautiful anime series in recent memory. He awarded each of the volumes ratings of A or A+ overall, and stated "Time will tell us whether or not this show will be remembered as fondly as it is regarded by the fan community now, but it feels like a masterpiece, something to be appreciated again and again. It is a must-see for anyone remotely interested in what anime can accomplish as an art form".

Awarding the series five stars out of five, Common Sense Media wrote that the "animation style is full of fluid motion and attention to detail that makes it a uniquely pleasurable experience to watch" and "the main characters [are] well developed and its hard not to get attached to them as the story progresses". Reviewers highly praised the series' darker approach to the popular magical girl subgenre in Japanese anime and manga. In its review of the series, the staff at Japanator said this trope "added a level of depth and complexity to the genre that we haven't ever seen, and I don't think we will see again ... [a]dding on that dressing gave the show a more perverse and cruel feeling to it, making it all the more compelling to watch". Liz Ohanesian of LA Weekly attributed the series' popularity with older, male audiences—an otherwise unusual demographic to the genre—to the genre deconstruction of Puella Magi Madoka Magica. She also commented on the series' cultural impact, writing that in Japan and the US there has been incredible fan interest for the series. She credited the all-star crew including writer Urobuchi, director Shinbo, and the Shaft animation studio as "hitmakers" and described the anime as "a series designed for acclaim". TechnologyTells Jenni Lada wrote that the show's external appearance belied its true "darker and more twisted" essence. She recommended viewers watch at least three episodes to discover the series' true nature.

According to Sara Cleto and Erin Bah, the subversion of the magical girl genre "draw[s] attention to the question of narrative power"—particularly in the use of alternative timelines—as the characters fight for their survival. Production I.G's Katsuyuki Motohiro watched Puella Magi Madoka Magica after hearing opinions that it exceeded Neon Genesis Evangelion. Upon viewing the series, he was "amazed that there was a person who could write such a work" and began analyzing Urobuchi's other works; he was motivated to ask Urobuchi to write the crime thriller Psycho-Pass. In issue 103 of Neo, journalist Matt Kamen wrote, "With its daring approach to a dated genre, Puella Magi Madoka Magica essentially does for magical girls what Neon Genesis Evangelion did for giant robots". Writing for Kotaku, critic Richard Eisenbeis hailed the series as "one of the best anime" and wrote, "It deconstructs the magical girl genre and builds an emotional narrative filled with memorable characters". Joshua Greenberg of The Daily Bruin described it as "a creepy, deconstructionist take on the [magical girl] genre."

Sales
The first Blu-ray volume of the series sold 53,000 copies in its first week, 22,000 of which were sold on its first day, breaking the record held by the sixth BD volume of Bakemonogatari. The second volume sold 54,000 copies, breaking the first volume's record. Each subsequent volume sold over 50,000 copies in their first week. As of October 2012, the total sales of BD and DVDs of the series recorded 600,000 copies, which was unusual for a late-night program at that time. This was despite controversy over the pricing of the volumes, which some considered to be unfairly high. The staff at Japanator stated they could not recommend the volume to their readers due to the prohibitive cost. Bertschy concurred, writing that the "limited episode count and high price of entry make the show inaccessible to an audience unwilling to shell out". The 2017 compilation album Puella Magi Madoka Magica Ultimate Best ranked at No. 4 on Oricon's weekly albums chart, having sold over 13,500 copies. By the end of 2017, Ultimate Best was the 29th best-selling anime CD album of the year.

A live broadcast of the entire series was streamed on Nico Nico Douga on June 18, 2011, garnering around a million viewers, surpassing the previous streaming audience record of 570,000 held by Lucky Star. According to Google Zeitgeist, Madoka Magica was the most-searched and fastest-rising search query in the anime category of 2011.

Accolades
The show won the Television Award at the 16th Animation Kobe Awards; as well as 12 Newtype Anime Awards; and the Grand Prize for animation in the 15th Japan Media Arts Festival awards, making it the first and only original anime television ever to win this award with the jury describing the series in their justification as  "an outstanding animation with an ingenious magical scenario" and commended the "ambitious" show for "skillfully setting critical traps that shook the very foundations of the genre". It was nominated for the 32nd Nihon SF Taisho Award; and won the 2011 Bronze Prize for Kyubey's catchphrase. It also won three 11th Tokyo Anime Awards in the Television Category, Best Director and Best Screenplay; and the Selection Committee Special Prize award at the 2012 Licensing of the Year awards. Madoka Magica was awarded a 43rd Seiun Award for "Best Media" at the 2012 Japan Science Fiction Convention; and was also awarded a Sisterhood Prize for the 11th Sense of Gender Awards. In 2015, the show was awarded the inaugural 1st Sugoi Japan Award Grand Prix; Japan's nationwide vote for manga, anime, and novels considered as cultural assets that have the potential to be beloved all over the world, among all of the works published since 2005. In 2017, Madoka Magica was selected as the best anime of 2011 by the Tokyo Anime Award Festival. 

Multiple media publications have hailed Puella Magi Madoka Magica as one of the best anime of the 2010s, that includes Polygon, Thrillist, Looper, IGN, Crunchyroll and Anime UK News. The Brazilian website Legiao Dos Herois listed the series as one of "10 most successful anime" of 2010s.

Awards and nominations

Legacy
The radio station Tokyo FM reported that Puella Magi Madoka Magica has developed into a social phenomenon in Japan. Toussaint Egan of Paste magazine stated that the series was "widely celebrated by fans and critics alike" upon its release and that the show is "a postmodern reconfiguration of genre tropes rife with plot twists and existential malaise on a cosmic horror level". The Spanish film director Carlos Vermut has cited Madoka Magica as a large influence on his 2014 film Magical Girl. The series was referenced in the HBO series Euphoria. Anime director Hiroyuki Imaishi said that darker-toned series like Madoka Magica are an "industry trend". The series also inspired a Nigerian magical girl franchise, Adorned by Chi''.

Notes

References

Further reading

External links

 Official website 
 Tenth anniversary website 
 Puella Magi Madoka Magica at Aniplex 
 Official manga website 
 Official PSP game website 
 Puella Magi Madoka Magica: The Battle Pentagram official website 
 Puella Magi Madoka Magica at Aniplex of America
 

 
2011 Japanese novels
2011 Japanese television series endings
2011 anime television series debuts
2011 manga
2012 manga
2012 video games
Anime and manga about time travel
Anime composed by Yuki Kajiura
Anime with original screenplays
Aniplex franchises
Apocalyptic anime and manga
Dark fantasy anime and manga
Existentialist anime and manga
Feminism in anime and manga
Houbunsha manga
Magical girl anime and manga
Mainichi Broadcasting System original programming
Muse Communication
Nitroplus
PlayStation Portable games
PlayStation Portable-only games
PlayStation Vita games
PlayStation Vita-only games
Psychological thriller anime and manga
Seinen manga
Shaft (company)
TBS Television (Japan) original programming
Television series about witchcraft
Time loop anime and manga
Video games featuring female protagonists
Works based on the Faust legend
Yen Press titles